Babylon A.D. is the debut album by the American hard rock band of the same name, released in 1989. It contains the metal hits "Bang Go The Bells", "Hammer Swings Down" and "The Kid Goes Wild" which was also featured in the film RoboCop 2.

Music Videos
In the music video for "The Kid Goes Wild", RoboCop attends a performance of Babylon A.D. and targets them for arrest. Interestingly, just two years later in 1991, the music video for the Guns N' Roses song "You Could Be Mine" featured the Terminator attending a performance of Guns N' Roses and targeting them for termination.

Track listing

Personnel
Band members
Derek Davis - vocals, acoustic guitar
Dan De La Rosa - guitars
Ron Freschi - guitars, backing vocals
Robb Reid - bass, backing vocals
Jamey Pacheco - drums

Additional musicians
John Matthews - guitars
Jimmy Wood - harmonica
Sam Kinison - vocals on "The Kid Goes Wild"

Production
Simon Hanhart - producer, engineer, mixing
Clark Germain, Eric Rudd, Julie Last, Scott Ralston, Guy Snider, Thom Roberts, Micajah Ryan, Chris Fuhrman - assistant engineers
Chris Bellman - mastering
Hugh Syme - art direction
John Scarpati - photography

Charts
Album - Billboard (North America)

References

Babylon A.D. albums
1989 debut albums
Arista Records albums